Rory David Morrison (5 August 1964 – 11 June 2013) was a newsreader and continuity announcer for BBC Radio 4.

Early life and education
Morrison was born in London in 1964, the eldest of Anne and Bob Morrison's three children. He was brought up in Malvern, Worcestershire, and was educated at The Chase School and Malvern College. At College, he performed well in drama and art, and as a prefect was appointed as Head of House. The English-Speaking Union awarded him a scholarship to Australia. He graduated from Durham University in 1986 with a degree in English Language and Literature.

Broadcasting career
Morrison began his radio broadcasting career as a travel reporter and presenter for Beacon Radio, an independent local radio station covering Shropshire, Wolverhampton and the Black Country. He first joined the BBC in 1990, as the presenter of an afternoon programme on BBC Radio Leeds. He later worked for two other local stations, BBC Radio York and BBC Radio Cleveland. He then moved to the British Forces Broadcasting Service before returning to the BBC as a continuity announcer on Radio 4 in April 1994. He later joined the newsreading team, and regularly appeared on The News Quiz, as a reader for amusing newspaper cuttings during the programme.

Personal life
Morrison married BBC journalist Nikki Jenkins in 1994; the couple met while working for BBC Radio Leeds, and had two children together.  Morrison was diagnosed with Waldenström's macroglobulinemia, a rare type of Non-Hodgkin lymphoma, in 2004. After his diagnosis, he became involved in raising money for the Lymphoma Association. In 2008, he took part in a fundraising walk with other radio newsreaders to Herstmonceux Castle in East Sussex, which formerly housed the machine used to generate the Greenwich Time Signal, or "pips". This event was organised for a special edition of the radio programme Ramblings, broadcast in April as "A Pilgrimage to the Pips". Morrison provided a live outdoor continuity announcement at the end of the programme. Morrison died from lymphoma in the University College London Hospital (UCLH), June 2013.

Filmography
 Page Eight (2011)

References

1964 births
2013 deaths
Alumni of University College, Durham
BBC newsreaders and journalists
British radio presenters
Deaths from non-Hodgkin lymphoma
People educated at Malvern College